The Walnut Street Bridge also known as The People's Bridge, is a truss bridge that spanned the Susquehanna River in Harrisburg, Pennsylvania until 1996. Built by the Phoenix Bridge Company in 1890, it is the oldest remaining bridge connecting Harrisburg's downtown and Riverfront Park with City Island. Since flooding in 1996 collapsed sections of the western span, it no longer connects to the West Shore. The bridge was added to the National Register of Historic Places in 1971. A 2014 Cross-River Connections Study notes that the bridge currently serves as an "important bicycle and pedestrian link between City Island and downtown Harrisburg, connecting the city and the Capital Area Greenbelt to special events on City Island."

History
The bridge was built to break the toll monopoly enjoyed by the neighboring Camelback Bridge (now the Market Street Bridge). The Walnut Street Bridge was closed to motor vehicles and converted to a pedestrian and bikeway link to City Island after the 1972 Hurricane Agnes flood. The eastern span of the bridge is outlined in lights which, along with the City Island facilities, create a dynamic visual effect at night. The  span is one of the longest pedestrian bridges in the world and was listed on the National Register of Historic Places in 1972. It is also recognized as a Historic Civil Engineering Landmark.

1996 collapse
On 20 January 1996, as a result of rising flood waters from the North American blizzard of 1996, the Walnut Street bridge lost two of its seven western spans when high floodwaters and a large ice floe lifted the spans off their foundations and swept them down the river. A third span was damaged and later collapsed into the river. This dramatic scene was recorded by an amateur videographer and shown on national news clips. Shortly after the loss of the three western spans, the People's Bridge Coalition was formed to support the restoration of the bridge. Public surveys in the early 2000s showed overwhelming support for the restoration of the western spans.

Shortly after the 1996 collapse, the Pennsylvania Department of Transportation contracted Modjeski and Masters, Inc., to perform an inspection and analysis to prevent the possibility of future collapse of the remaining structure. A $5 million rehabilitation project was later conducted on the eastern span of the bridge. The rehabilitation project was performed by IA Construction Corporation of Concordville, Pennsylvania. When it was announced that the western span wouldn't be reconstructed, citizens formed The People's Bridge Coalition, which has since reorganized into a non-profit, the Walnut Street Bridge Society.

See also
List of bridges documented by the Historic American Engineering Record in Pennsylvania
List of crossings of the Susquehanna River

References

Further reading

External links

  PennLive.com: "Coalition continues fund-raising to restore Walnut Street Bridge" — 2008 article.

Bridges in Harrisburg, Pennsylvania
Bridges over the Susquehanna River
Former road bridges in the United States
Pedestrian bridges in Pennsylvania
Truss bridges in the United States
Bridges completed in 1890
Road bridges on the National Register of Historic Places in Pennsylvania
Historic Civil Engineering Landmarks
Historic American Engineering Record in Pennsylvania
National Register of Historic Places in Harrisburg, Pennsylvania
Wrought iron bridges in the United States